Sarfarosh is a 1989 Pakistani action film, directed by Iqbal Kashmiri and produced by Sheikh Nazir Hussain. Editor: Mohammed Ashiq Ali The film stars actors Neeli, Sultan Rahi, Sushma Shahi, Abid Ali.

Cast
 Sultan Rahi
 Neeli
 Jahanzeb
 Sushma Shahi
 Rangeela
 Abid Ali
 Qavi Khan
 Abid Butt
 Faisel Iqbal
 Aslam Latar
 Asim Bukhari

Soundtrack

Track listing

References

1989 films
Pakistani action films
1989 action films
Pakistani political films
Punjabi-language Pakistani films
1980s Punjabi-language films
Political action films